Jon Eirik Ødegaard (born 29 September 1972) is a retired Norwegian footballer.

Hailing from Røros, he failed to break through from the junior ranks to the senior team at Rosenborg and instead tried his luck in Hamkam. Following relegation from the 1995 Tippeligaen he moved back to Trondheim and took one year in Strindheim and Byåsen each. He was brought back to the first tier by Vålerenga, and played three seasons there and four in Moss. Originally a midfielder, he was converted to left back while at Moss. After quitting his professional career due to serious injury he had outings for low-league teams Rapid and Tronvik.

The son of a camping site and hotel owner in Røros, Ødegaard elected not to take over the family business and instead settled at Jeløya in Moss. He coached Moss' junior team for four years before becoming Tor Thodesen's assistant manager ahead of the 2011 season. He was later a player developer in local minnows Sprint-Jeløy and used his chef training to lead a cafeteria.

References

1972 births
Living people
Norwegian footballers
People from Røros
Hamarkameratene players
Strindheim IL players
Byåsen Toppfotball players
Vålerenga Fotball players
Moss FK players
Eliteserien players
Norwegian First Division players
Association football midfielders
Sportspeople from Trøndelag